A support band may refer to

 Maternity clothing used to compress and support the womb
 Opening act, a band supporting the main performance at a concert

See also
 Harness (disambiguation)